Quansah is a surname. Notable people with the surname include:

Abeiku Quansah (born 1990), Ghanaian footballer
Derrick Ansah Quansah (born 1990), Computer Science Engineer
Charles Quansah (born 1964), Ghanaian serial killer
Kwame Quansah (born 1982), Ghanaian footballer
Nat Quansah, Ghanaian botanist and academic

Ghanaian surnames